Vadlapudi is a neighbourhood in the city of Visakhapatnam, state of Andhra Pradesh, India. It is a suburban area of the city.

About
It is on the south side of the city.

Transport
Vadlapudi is well connected with Madhurawada, Maddilapalem, 
Gajuwaka and Scindia, Visakhapatnam.

References

Neighbourhoods in Visakhapatnam